The PSTAR, originally standing for Pre-Solo Test of Air Regulations but now called Student Pilot Permit or Private Pilot Licence for Foreign and Military Applicants, Aviation Regulation Examination, is a written examination that a student studying for their Private Pilot Licence in Canada must pass before being awarded their Student Pilot Permit. All students must achieve a pass mark of 90% before commencing their first solo flight.

The exam is a multiple choice test of 50 questions covering the areas of;
 Canadian Aviation Regulations (CARs)
 Air traffic control Clearances and Instructions
 Air traffic control procedures as they apply to the control of VFR traffic at controlled airports
 Air traffic procedures at uncontrolled airports and aerodromes
 Special VFR Regulations
 Aeronautical Information Circulars
 NOTAM (Notice to Airmen)

The exam is administered by authorized flight training centres across Canada, or by Transport Canada regional offices.

References 

Aviation in Canada